Abdul Rahman Abanda (born 24 August 1990), known as Abanda Rahman, is an Indonesian professional footballer who plays as a central defender for Liga 1 club Madura United.

Early life
His popular nickname "Abanda" comes from when he was volunteering at an orphanage in Makassar in 2005 and the children there gave him the nickname.

Club career

Kalteng Putra
In 2019, Abanda Rahman signed a one-year contract with Indonesian Liga 1 club Kalteng Putra. He made his league debut on 26 July 2019 in a match against TIRA-Persikabo at the Pakansari Stadium, Cibinong.

PSIS Semarang
He was signed for PSIS Semarang to play in Liga 1 in the 2020 season. This season was suspended on 27 March 2020 due to the COVID-19 pandemic. The season was abandoned and was declared void on 20 January 2021.

Bhayangkara FC
In 2021, Abanda Rahman signed a contract with Indonesian Liga 1 club Bhayangkara. He made his league debut on 6 December 2021 in a match against Persela Lamongan at the Maguwoharjo Stadium, Sleman.

Madura United
Abanda was signed for Madura United to play in Liga 1 in the 2022–23 season. He made his league debut on 20 December 2022 in a match against Arema at the Sultan Agung Stadium, Bantul.

References

External links
 
 Abdul Rahman at ligaindonesiabaru.com

1990 births
Living people
People from Kendari
Sportspeople from Southeast Sulawesi
Indonesian footballers
PPSM Magelang players
Kalteng Putra F.C. players
PSM Makassar players
Persegres Gresik  players
Gresik United players
Persik Kediri players
PSPS Riau players
Persis Solo players
PSIS Semarang players
Bhayangkara F.C. players
Madura United F.C. players
Liga 1 (Indonesia) players
Liga 2 (Indonesia) players
Association football central defenders